Andrea Miklós (born 17 April 1999) is a Romanian sprinter specialising in the 400 metres. She competed in the 4 × 400 metres relay at the 2016 IAAF World Indoor Championships winning a bronze medal. Her personal bests in the 400 metres are 52.31 seconds outdoors (Grosseto 2017) and 53.82 seconds indoors (Istanbul 2016).

Competition record

References

External links
 

1999 births
Living people
Romanian female sprinters
Place of birth missing (living people)
Olympic athletes of Romania
Athletes (track and field) at the 2016 Summer Olympics
World Athletics Indoor Championships medalists
Olympic female sprinters

Romanian sportspeople of Hungarian descent